Wonderland is the debut album by the American singer-songwriter Noosa, released May 21, 2014.

The album was recorded in 2013 by producer Mickey Valen in his apartment, and mixed by Jared Robbins. Wonderland is pressed in vinyl.

Track listing

References

2014 debut albums